The 2015 Première ligue de soccer du Québec season is the fourth season of play for the Première ligue de soccer du Québec; the highest level of soccer based in the Canadian province of Québec and one of two Division 3 semi-professional soccer leagues in the Canadian soccer pyramid (the other being League1 Ontario).

The season began on 2 May 2015 and ended on 18 October 2015, with the cup final taking place on 24 October 2015.  CS Longueuil was the defending champion from 2014.

CS Mont-Royal Outremont won the League championship.

Changes from 2014
Two new teams joined the league for this season, while ACP Montréal-Nord did not return due to administrative difficulties.  Joining the league are Lakeshore SC, which is based in the southwestern portion of the island of Montreal, while the other is an academy team of Ottawa Fury FC, whose primary team competes in the Division 2 North American Soccer League.  This expansion into Ottawa marks the first time a team from outside Québec will take part in the PLSQ, with Fury FC citing the proximity of other teams as making the PLSQ a logical choice.

This season will also feature the arrival of a reserve division, which will allow PLSQ teams to establish a youth development pathway.  In addition, the league commissioned Montreal composer Vincent Duhaime-Perreault to compose an anthem for the league, which will be played prior to all season and cup matches.

Teams

Source:

Standings
Each team will play 18 matches as part of the season; three matches against each other team in the league split home and away.  There are no playoffs at the end of the season; the first-place team will be crowned as league champion and will face the L1O league champion in the Inter-Provincial Cup.

Top scorers

Awards

Cup

The cup tournament is a separate contest from the rest of the season, in which all seven teams from the league take part, and is unrelated to the season standings.  It is not a form of playoffs at the end of the season (as is typically seen in North American sports), but is a competition running in parallel to the regular season (similar to the Canadian Championship or the FA Cup), albeit only for PLSQ teams.  All matches are separate from the regular season, and are not reflected in the season standings.

The 2015 PLSQ Cup will maintain the same format as the previous season, as a two-game aggregate knockout tournament with a single match final.  As defending champion, FC Gatineau will obtain a bye for the first round.

First round

Semifinals

Final

Inter-Provincial Cup Championship 
The Inter-Provincial Cup Championship was a two-legged home-and-away series between the league champions of League1 Ontario and the Première ligue de soccer du Québec – the only Division 3 men's semi-professional soccer leagues based fully within Canada.

Oakville Blue Devils won 5–3 on aggregate

Reserve Division
The league operated a reserve division.

References

External links

Premiere
Première ligue de soccer du Québec seasons